Schefflera procumbens is a species of plant in the family Araliaceae. It is endemic to Seychelles, now confined to six small areas on Silhouette Island at altitudes between 400 and 700 meters, having become extinct on Mahé.

Schefflera procumbens is a climbing epiphyte, with gray bark, palmate leaves on petioles up to 20 cm in length, and cream-colored, globular fruits in clusters.

References

procumbens
Vulnerable plants
Endemic flora of Seychelles
Taxonomy articles created by Polbot